Mtakoudja is a town located on the island of Mohéli in the Comoros.

Populated places in Mohéli